Independence is a city in and the county seat of Montgomery County, Kansas, United States.  As of the 2020 census, the population of the city was 8,548.  It was named in commemoration of the Declaration of Independence.

History

Independence was settled on land that was purchased from the Osage Indians in September 1869 by George A. Brown for the price of $50; they were being moved to Indian Territory in present-day Oklahoma. He originally called the townsite Colfax after Schuyler Colfax, vice president under President Ulysses S. Grant. On August 21, 1869 a group of Oswego, Kansas men led by R. W. Wright settled there with the intent to make Independence the county seat.  E. E. Wilson and F D. Irwin opened the first store in October 1869, Wilson & Irwin Groceries. Independence was designated county seat in 1870.

A permanent lighting system was first used for an exhibition baseball game on April 17, 1930 between the Independence Producers and House of David semi-professional baseball team of Benton Harbor, Michigan, with the Independence team winning with a score of 9 to 1 before a crowd of 1,700 spectators.

Miss Able, a rhesus monkey, was born at Ralph Mitchell Zoo.  Miss Able along with Miss Baker, a squirrel monkey, became the first monkeys to fly in space; they returned alive on May 28, 1959.

Geography
Independence is located along the Verdigris River just south of its confluence with the Elk River.

Climate
Independence has a humid subtropical climate (Köppen Cfa) characterized by hot, humid and unpleasant summers, and chilly though extremely variable winters. Precipitation is heavy in summer due to frequent incursions of very moist air from the Gulf of Mexico: as much as  fell on May 27, 1984 and a maximum daily fall of  can be expected in an average calendar year. The wettest month has been June 2007 when  was reported, whereas July 1935 saw a mere . The winters are drier and cold, although temperatures in winter are very erratic, ranging from an average of four afternoons in the three winter months above  to an average of three mornings below . Winters are much drier than the summer, with November 1986 and October 1952 seeing not even a trace of precipitation.

Overall the wettest calendar year has been 1908 with  – although the incomplete year of 2007 likely had more than this – and the driest 1952 with only .

Demographics

2010 census
As of the census of 2010, there were 9,483 people, 3,950 households, and 2,430 families living in the city. The racial makeup of the city was 84.2% White, 6.5% African American, 1.6% Native American, 0.9% Asian, 2.3% from other races, and 4.5% from two or more races. Hispanic or Latino of any race were 6.5% of the population.

There were 3,950 households, of which 33.0% had children under the age of 18 living with them, 40.9% were married couples living together, 14.9% had a female householder with no husband present, 5.7% had a male householder with no wife present, and 38.5% were non-families. 33.0% of all households were made up of individuals, and 14.8% had someone living alone who was 65 years of age or older. The average household size was 2.35 and the average family size was 2.95.

The median age in the city was 36.9 years. 26% of residents were under the age of 18; 8.6% were between the ages of 18 and 24; 24.5% were from 25 to 44; 24.9% were from 45 to 64; and 15.9% were 65 years of age or older. The gender makeup of the city was 48.4% male and 51.6% female.

2000 census
As of the census of 2000, there were 9,846 people, 4,149 households, and 2,609 families living in the city. The racial makeup of the city was 87.00% White, 7.17% African American, 1.16% Native American, 0.62% Asian, 0.01% Pacific Islander, 1.10% from other races, and 2.95% from two or more races. Hispanic or Latino of any race were 3.84% of the population.

There were 4,149 households, out of which 30.2% had children under the age of 18 living with them, 46.8% were married couples living together, 12.3% had a female householder with no husband present, and 37.1% were non-families. 32.7% of all households were made up of individuals, and 15.2% had someone living alone who was 65 years of age or older. The average household size was 2.32, and the average family size was 2.93.

In the city, the population was spread out, with 25.7% under the age of 18, 8.9% from 18 to 24, 26.1% from 25 to 44, 21.3% from 45 to 64, and 18.0% who were 65 years of age or older. The median age was 37 years. For every 100 females, there were 89.9 males. For every 100 females age 18 and over, there were 84.9 males.

The median income for a household in the city was $29,574, and the median income for a family was $37,134. Males had a median income of $26,552 versus $20,017 for females. The per capita income for the city was $15,496. About 11.4% of families and 13.1% of the population were below the poverty line, including 18.7% of those under age 18 and 13.2% of those age 65 or over.

Education

Colleges
The Independence Community College main campus is located two miles south of the city. ICC West Campus is located in the city one mile west of the downtown.  Each semester, over 1000 students are enrolled at ICC.

Primary and secondary education
The community is served by Independence USD 446 public school district.
 Independence High School (9–12)
 Independence Middle School (6–8)
 Jefferson Elementary School (3–5)
 Eisenhower Elementary School (PreK–2)

Private schools
 Zion Lutheran School (PreK–8)
 St. Andrew School (PreK–8)
 Independence Bible School (PreK–12)

Special education
 Tri-County Education Co-operative, special education (all grades)

Transportation

Highway transportation
Independence is located at the intersection of US-75 and US-160.

Railroad transportation
Independence is served by two railroad companies:

 The Union Pacific Railroad is one of the largest class one railroads in the United States and operates on the former Missouri Pacific Railroad tracks. The headquarters for Union Pacific is located at Omaha, Nebraska.
 The South Kansas and Oklahoma Railroad, which is a short line railroad owned by WATCO Companies based at Pittsburg, Kansas and operates on the former Atchison, Topeka and Santa Fe Railway tracks.

Airports

Area events
 The Neewollah Festival takes place in late October.  Neewollah is halloween spelled backwards.

Area attractions
 Independence Community College is home to the William Inge Center for the Arts, which maintains the archives of playwright and alumnus, William Inge. The center utilizes the writer's boyhood home for a playwrights-in-residence program, and sponsors the annual William Inge Festival. Each year during the festival a lifetime achievement award is bestowed on a nationally recognized American playwright.
 The State of Kansas designated the childhood home of Laura Ingalls Wilder and the Ingalls family near Independence as a historic site; it is open to visitors. It is the location where the Charles Ingalls family resided between 1869-1871 and is described in his daughter Laura Ingalls Wilder's book Little House on the Prairie. It includes a cabin modeled after the original and the post office that was originally located at nearby Wayside, Kansas. The Sunnyside School, a one-room schoolhouse that was moved to the site, is also featured. Much of the surrounding countryside retains its open and undeveloped nature. Then located on the Osage reservation, the property is now within the boundaries of the William Kurtis Ranch about 13 miles southwest of downtown Independence.
 At the 1964 New York World's Fair, Sinclair Oil sponsored a dinosaur exhibit, featuring life-size replicas of nine different dinosaurs. On flatbed trucks, they toured the United States. Headquartered in Independence, Sinclair Pipeline Company, a division of Sinclair Oil, was acquired by Atlantic Richfield (ARCO). After the acquisition by ARCO, one of the nine dinosaurs, the Corythosaurus, was donated to Riverside Park.
 Elk City Lake and Elk City State Park are located approximately five miles west of Independence. There are six hiking trails located at Elk City Lake, two of which are notable for receiving a National Trails designation. It is also in this area that the ruins of the Le Hunt cement plant are located, although the site on private property.
 Montgomery County State Lake is located approximately 4 miles (6.44 km) south of the city on county road 3600. The lake offers boating and fishing opportunities to the area. 
 Riverside Park and Ralph Mitchell Zoo is located on East Oak Street between Pennsylvania and Park Streets on the northeast side of the city. The park offers playground, 4-H, and meeting facilities, picnic areas, tennis courts, miniature golf, miniature train, and a merry go round. It is also the location of Emmot Field, the home field for sporting events for the Independence Middle School, Independence High School, and the Independence Community College. The Ralph Mitchell Zoo is the home for many species of mammals and reptiles, and was the homeplace of the rhesus macaque Miss Able, who was chosen by NASA alongside Miss Baker to test out space travel and become the first animals launched into space; she is commemorated with a sign. The park is also home to Shulthis Stadium and Emmot Field, which is the site of the first night baseball game, and the home field where Mickey Mantle began his professional baseball career.

Notable people

 Taylor Armstrong, born as Shana Hughes, former reality show celebrity on The Real Housewives of Beverly Hills
 Tacy Atkinson, Christian missionary
 Sheila Bair, former chairwoman, Federal Deposit Insurance Corporation
 Gerry Bamman, actor
 Benny Bartlett, actor
 Elizabeth Broun, art historian
 Donald Graham Burt, Academy Award winning production designer
 Jim Halsey, artist manager, agent, and impresario
 Sherman Halsey, music video producer and director, talent agent
 Scott Hastings, NBA basketball player
 William Wadsworth Hodkinson, founded Paramount Pictures and ventured into commercial aviation
 Lyman U. Humphrey, newspaper editor, banker, 7th Governor of Kansas
 William Inge, Pulitzer Prize-winning playwright, Academy Award-winning screenwriter
 Bill Kurtis, television journalist
 Alf Landon, 1936 Republican presidential candidate, 26th Governor of Kansas
 Mary Howard de Liagre, actress
 Mickey Mantle, Major league baseball hall-of-famer, started his professional baseball career in Independence.
 Dave McGinnis, NFL coach
 John Morris, composer
 Gareth Porter, historian, author and international journalist
 Derek Schmidt, former congressional aide, Kansas Senate Majority Leader and since 2011, Attorney General of Kansas 
 Jean Schodorf, former Kansas Senate Majority Leader and congressional candidate.
 Harry F. Sinclair, founder of Sinclair Oil
 Charlie Tidwell,  sprinter/hurdler active between 1958–60
 Vivian Vance, actress 
 Ron Warner, NFL football player

References

Further reading

 A Guide to Historic Homes in Independence, Kansas; Ken D. Brown; Independence Tribune; 1993.
 Art Work on Eastern Kansas - part 10 of 12; Western Photogravure Company; 1900. (contains photo of Independence High School)

External links

 
 Independence - Directory of Public Officials
 Independence Chamber of Commerce
 Independence city map, KDOT

 
1869 establishments in Kansas
Cities in Kansas
Cities in Montgomery County, Kansas
County seats in Kansas
Populated places established in 1869